Scarlet Nexus is an anime series based on the video game of the same name. On March 18, 2021, the adaptation produced by Sunrise was announced and licensed by Funimation outside of Asia. Medialink licensed the anime in South and Southeast Asia. Hiroyuki Nishimura directed the series and Yōichi Katō, Toshizō Nemoto and Akiko Inoue wrote the series' scripts, with Nishimura and Yuji Ito designing the characters, and Hironori Anazawa composing the series' music. The series aired from July 1 to December 23, 2021. From episodes 1–13, the first opening theme is "Red Criminal" by The Oral Cigarettes, who previously performed the game's theme song, "Dream In Drive", while the first ending theme is "Fire" by Yamato(.S). From episodes 14–26, the second opening theme is "MACHINEGUN" by The Oral Cigarettes, while the second ending theme is "Stranger" by Ayumu Imazu.

On August 5, 2021, Funimation premiered an English dub of the series on their streaming service.


Episode list

<onlyinclude>

Home Media release

Japanese

Notes

References

Scarlet Nexus